Stylus Studio is an integrated development environment (IDE) for the Extensible Markup Language (XML). It consists of a variety of tools and visual designers to edit and transform XML documents and legacy data such as electronic data interchange (EDI), comma-separated values (CSV) and relational data.

XML editor 
Stylus Studio includes three general purpose XML editing views: Text View, Tree View, and Grid View, allowing working with and editing XML documents in ways to suits many user styles. A Schema tab provides a convenient way to view a document's associated content model (i.e., its schema). If no XML content model has been defined, the "Schema" tab can be used to generate XML schema or to generate DTD. XML editing views are synchronized, and can be switched between at any time simply by clicking the tabs at the bottom of the main editing window.

Text View 
The XML text editor supports syntax coloring, code sensing, schema driven autocomplete and code folding.

Tree View 
Tree View incrementally loads an XML file according to the nodes users expand, and allows analyzing and editing very large XML data files. Tree View is also specialized to handle document type definition (XML DTD) and XML schema.

Grid View 
The XML Grid View provides a  spreadsheet-like interface enabling more productive work with relational data or any XML document with repeating data structures, addressing a need that arises often when working with raw XML data in typical XML data integration applications.

XML Schema Editor 
Stylus Studio provides synchronized XML schema text editing and visual XML schema diagram views. Changes made to an XML schema in the text editor are  synchronized with the Diagram View, and vice versa. The schema editor includes an integrated XML schema documentation generator, to publish XML content models in HTML format.

XSLT Visual Mapping Tool 
The XSLT Mapper displays input documents on the left, and the target on the right. To map data, simply drag source nodes and drop them on the target, connecting the data sources to the desired data output. On the XSLT Source tab, the XSLT is displayed composed, based on the source-target relationship defined in the mapping operation. The code being generated is standard W3C XSLT and XPath code.

XML Pipeline Designer 
Stylus Studio provides a visual designer for creating XML pipelines in terms of a series of operations, for example, converting, validating, transforming, or performing other operations on an XML document. The XML Pipeline designer can automate many common tasks including Java code generation and debugging of XML processing applications.

EDI to XML SEF Editor 
The EDI to XML Conversion module helps convert EDI to XML and create custom EDI conversion definitions. It provides support for a variety of dialects including EDIFACT, HL7,  X12, HIPAA, IATA, AL3, EANCOM and NCPDP.

History 
June 8, 2001 Stylus Studio 3.0 was released. At the time it was primarily an XSLT IDE and the very first to feature an XSLT two-way editor and visual XML to XML mapping tool.

June 2002 Stylus Studio 2004 released a two way visual schema designer for XML Schema 1.0 and the first IDE to feature postmortem stack trace for XSLT with back mapping to the XSLT source. At that time it was the only XSLT debugger supporting cross-debugging between XSLT and Java extension functions.

September 2, 2003, Stylus Studio 5.0 introduced the very first XQuery two-way editor and visual XML to XML mapping tool. In addition this release introduced XSLT and XQuery profiler.

October 4, 2004, Stylus Studio 6.0 added support for XSLT 2.0  a Grid View to its XML Editor and a new visual module called Convert To XML to convert flat file formats to XML.

June 13, 2006, Stylus Studio 2006 Release 3 bundled DataDirect XQuery 2.0 the first XQuery implementation over multiple relational database like  SQL Server, Oracle, DB2.

September 26, 2006, Stylus Studio 2007 introduced a visual designer and debugger for XML Pipeline and a graphical editor for building reports using XSLT or XQuery called Stylus Studio XML Publisher.

December 11, 2007, Stylus Studio 2008 bundled DataDirect XML Converters for Java and .NET and added .NET code generation. Starting with this release converter engines are licensed separately from Stylus Studio.

December 4, 2008 Stylus Studio 2009 added support for XQuery Update Facility 1.0.

November 17, 2009 Stylus Studio 2010. The XQuery visual mapping tool added support for relational update. The XQuery text editor added code refactoring.

November 10 2010 Stylus Studio 2011 added support for SQL update expressions to the XQuery Mapping tool and code refactoring to the XQuery editor.

November 13, 2011 Stylus Studio X14, added support for XSLT 3.0 and XQuery 3.0 Working Draft 14 June 2011.

July 23, 2012 Stylus Studio X14 Release 2, added new visual schema designer for Relax NG.

December 3, 2012 Stylus Studio X15 added HTML WYSIWYG Designer, mapping automation with AutoLink and a new XSLT Editor auto-complete implementation.

May 7, 2014 Stylus Studio X15 Release 2, added support for executing and debugging XSLT 3.0 and XQuery 3.0 final and Apache FOP 1.1 was integrated.

May 17, 2016 Stylus Studio X16, added 64-bit version, SQL Editor, New Generic bi-directional Converter for fixed-width format, certified Windows 10 ready.

See also
 List of XML editors

External links 
 Stylus Studio Web Site
 Download Page

XML editors